Iophon husvikense is a species of sea sponge first found on the coast of South Georgia island, in the south west Southern Ocean.

References

Further reading

Aguilar-Camacho, Jose Maria, Jose Luis Carballo, and Jose Antonio Cruz-Barraza. "Acarnidae (Porifera: Demospongiae: Poecilosclerida) from the Mexican Pacific Ocean with the description of six new species." Scientia Marina 77.4 (2013): 677–696.

External links
WORMS

Poecilosclerida